Greater Mohali Area Development Authority, shortly known as GMADA, is state development authority of Punjab State, India. Chief minister of Punjab is its chairman. GMADA has three functioning committees: executive committee, planning and design committee, and Budget and Accounts Scrutiny Committee. GMADA works in Mohali, Banur, Zirakpur, Dera Bassi, Kharar, Mullanpur, Fatehgarh Sahib, Mandi Gobindgarh and Rupnagar

Prominent recent housing projects of GMADA are  Aerocity,  Aerotropolis and  Ecocity.

References

Government of Punjab, India
Sahibzada Ajit Singh Nagar district
Mohali